Saptha tabularia is a moth in the family Choreutidae. It was described by Edward Meyrick in 1912. It is found on the Loyalty Islands of New Caledonia.

References

Choreutidae
Moths described in 1912